Carpenter Beach, Maryland is a populated place located in Calvert County, Maryland. Carpenter Beach appears on the Prince Frederick U.S. Geological Survey Map. The average elevation is 23 feet.

References

Geography of Calvert County, Maryland